Sodiq Suraj (born 8 January 1988 in Oshogbo) is Nigerian football player who plays for Osun United.

Career 
Sodiq Suraj is a central defender who can also play as defensive midfielder. In 2008, he played in Serbian second level in FK Partizan's satellite team FK Teleoptik.  In the season 2012–13 he played for OC Safi at Moroccan top division. In October 2013 he signed with Duhok SC in the Iraqi Premier League. Next season, in 2014, he switched to another Iraqi club, Naft Al-Wasat SC.

Position 
His natural position is defender and is a variable and strong defence man. Sodiq plays as Libero or as Left full back on the national team.

International career 
Sodiq Suraj played with Nigeria U-20 at the 2007 African Youth Championship where they were losing finalists, thus qualifying for the U-20 World Cup. Next he played with Nigeria national under-20 football team, at the 2007 FIFA U-20 World Cup in Canada where they reached the quarter-finals.

Honours 
Nigeria U-20
Finalist at 2007 African Youth Championship
Quarter-Finalist of 2007 FIFA U-20 World Cup

References 

1988 births
Living people
Nigerian footballers
Nigerian expatriate footballers
Nigeria under-20 international footballers
Association football defenders
FK Teleoptik players
Serbian First League players
Expatriate footballers in Serbia
Sunshine Stars F.C. players
Duhok SC players
Expatriate footballers in Morocco
Sportspeople from Osogbo
Expatriate footballers in Iraq
Shooting Stars S.C. players
Nigerian expatriate sportspeople in Iraq
Nigerian expatriate sportspeople in Djibouti
Nigerian expatriate sportspeople in Morocco
Nigerian expatriate sportspeople in Serbia
Expatriate footballers in Djibouti
Kwara United F.C. players
Olympic Club de Safi players
Osun United F.C. players
First Bank F.C. players
Djibouti Premier League players
AS Arta/Solar7 players